These Dangerous Years (also known as Dangerous Youth) is a 1957 British drama musical film directed by Herbert Wilcox and starring George Baker, Frankie Vaughan, Carole Lesley, Thora Hird, Kenneth Cope, David Lodge and John Le Mesurier.

The army sequences were filmed in the Inglis Barracks, Mill Hill, London NW7.

Plot
Tough gang leader and wannabe rock star Dave Wyman, from the slums of Liverpool, gets called up for National Service. He undergoes basic training, finds the discipline surprisingly suits him, and emerges stronger. When his best friend from training is killed by the camp bully, Dave takes revenge, and eventually ends up marrying his singing partner.

Cast
 George Baker as the Padre
 Frankie Vaughan as Dave Wyman
 Carole Lesley as Dinah Brown
 Jocelyn Lane as Maureen
 Katherine Kath as Mrs Wyman
 Thora Hird as Mrs Larkin
 Eddie Byrne as Danny
 Kenneth Cope as Juggler
 Robert Desmond as Cream O'Casey
 Ray Jackson as Smiler Larkin
 Richard Leech as Captain Brewster
 John Le Mesurier as Commanding Officer
 David Lodge as Sergeant Major Lockwood
 Michael Ripper as Private Simpson
 Reginald Beckwith as Hairdresser
 Martin Boddey as Police Sergeant
 Lloyd Lamble as Police Officer
 Bunner O'Keeffe as youth buying the Liverpool Echo

Production
It was the first solo producing effort from Anna Neagle. The film was known as The Cast Iron Shore and was to be the first of three films Neagle made with Diana Dors. However Dors was in Hollywood and declined to return to make the film .

George Baker later said it "wasn’t a good film. Herbert was trying to break away, you see. They'd all gone for Frankie Vaughan and this was a Liverpool film with a message about how tough it is in the Dingle. It wasn’t attractive to a lot of people because it wasn’t well enough made. The script was by Jack Trevor Story and he and Herbert had no meeting-ground whatever."

Reception
According to Kinematograph Weekly the film was "in the money" at the British box office in 1957.

References

External links

1957 films
British musical comedy films
1957 musical comedy films
Films shot at Associated British Studios
Films directed by Herbert Wilcox
Military humor in film
1950s English-language films
1950s British films